Popstars is a French musical reality TV series based on the international series of the same name. The French television series was broadcast on M6 for 4 seasons and was a pioneer in musical competitions in France. It is currently broadcast on D8.

The first season of French Popstars was launched on 20 September 2001 and continued until 20 December 2001 won by L5, followed by a second season 2002 won by Whatfor, a third season in 2004 (known as Popstars - le duel) won by Linkup, and a fourth season after 4 years of interruption, held in 2007 and won by Sheryfa Luna.

The first season was to launch pop groups from casting to the launch of a debut album, whereas series 4 was for launching of a solo artist. Genres of music presented ranged form pop to rock, R&B, rap and hip hop. Contrary to other competitions, eliminations were decided by a jury and not by the public.

Season 1 (2001)
Broadcast: 20 September - 20 December 2001
Jury: 
Santi, former general director of Mercury France
Mia Frye, choreographer
Pascal Broussot, artistic director of M6
Winners: 
L5 - a girl group made up of Lydy (known as Louisy Joseph), Marjorie, Coralie, Alexandra and Claire)

Season 2 (2002)
Broadcast: 29 August - 19 December 2002
Jury: 
Valéry Zeitoun, director of AZ, a subsidiary of Universal Music
Bruno Vandelli, choreographer
Elisabeth Anaïs, songwriter
Winners: Whatfor made up of Cyril, Nicolas, Érika and Monia (Monia Righi)

Season 3 (2003)
Broadcast: 28 August - 20 November 2004
This season was named "Popstars - le duel" 
Jury: 
Olivier Nusse, general director of ULM
Angie Cazaux-Berthias, vocal coach, singer
Roberto Ciurleo, director of NRJ radio station
Winners: Linkup made up of Matthieu (Matthieu Tota) (later famous as M. Pokora), Lionel (Lionel Tim) and Otis
Runners-up (in duel): Diadems

Season 4 (2007)
Broadcast: 3 September - 26 October 2007
Jury: 
Mia Frye, choreographer
Benjamin Chulvanij, Music producer and director 
Sébastien Farran, music manager
Ophélie Winter, songwriter and singer
Workshop
D.Dy: singing and urban flow workshop
Youssoupha: writing workshop
Nancy Marie-Claire: dance workshop
Winner: Sheryfa Luna (solo)
Other participants - Eliminations after:
day 1: Fabio
day 3: Delphine
day 7: Lakdar, Noémie, Jonathan, Gabrielle, Samir and Mehdi (later the duo Twem)
day 10: Sullivan and Emeraude
day 12: Keda, Wendee, Salim, Ibtisame
day 14: Yéché
day 20: Nicolas, Romain, Priscillia and Nathanael
day 25: Vanessa, Pierre-Jean, St Cyr 
day 30 (before the finals): Moussa, Isaac, Zack, Marion, Léa
Finalists: Jessie and Hadja (with finalist Sheryfa Luna winning the contest)

Season 5 (2013)
Broadcast: 28 May 2013 - 2 July 2013
Channel : D8
Jury: Alexia Laroche-Joubert, La Fouine, Philippe Gandilhon.
Winners: The Mess (girl group) 
Runners-up: Oslo (pop rock duo)

In popular culture
Of the participants in Popstars as part of groups, Louisy Joseph (of L5) from season 1 and M. Pokora (of Linkup) of season 3 went on to have successful solo careers 
Identical twin brother Samir and Mehdi formed later the duo Twem and took part in both the British and the French X Factor competition.
Winner from season 4 Sheryfa Luna became a successful artist. 4th season contestant Léa Castel also had a solo career, whereas Zack, from season 4 became a professional dancer and dance instructor in French X Factor in its second season

See also
List of French television series

References

External links
  Popstars: France on imdb

Popstars
French reality television series
French music television series
2001 French television series debuts
French television series based on New Zealand television series
M6 (TV channel) original programming